Sanjay Padiyoor  is an Indian film director, production controller and an actor in the Malayalam film industry. He started his career in 1991 with Jubilee Production as an office worker and before becoming a production controller. He did more than 100 films in the Malayalam and Tamil film industry as production controller.

He debuted as a director with the Malayalam movie titled Aval - Journey of a woman,

Personal life
Sanjay Padiyoor was born in Padiyoor , Irinjalakuda , Thrissur in the Indian state of Kerala.  He completed his schooling at Donbosco European Primary School, Padiyoor , St Sebastian Anglo Indian UP School Padiyoor and BVM High School in Kaiparamba  and completed his Graduation in NSS ARTS College in Irinjalakuda.

Career

His first movie as a production manager was City Police directed by Venu B Nair in the year 1992 and from there he did more than 100 movies in the Malayalam and Tamil Movie industry. His first movie as a production controller was Captain, directed by Nizar. His acting debut was in the same movie. He completed various movies as a production controller and on movies like Banaras, directed by Nemam Pushparaj. The movie won various awards, including a national award for the singer Shreya Ghoshal. He worked on Bhoothakkannadi, Marumalarchi, Aadum Koothu, Gadhama, Salt N' Pepper, One, Kaaval Djibouti (film) and Celluloid.

His debut movie as a director was Aval - Journey of a woman.

Filmography

As director

As production Controller

References

External links
 
 Lucsam Creations Production Controller Sanjay Padiyoor
 News Sanjay Padiyoor
  Actor Sanjay Padiyoor
 Director Sanjay Shanmughan

1973 births
Malayali people
People from Thrissur district
Malayalam film producers
Living people
Film directors from Kerala
Film producers from Kerala
Malayalam film directors